Platylesches fosta is a butterfly in the family Hesperiidae. It is found in western Uganda and Tanzania (along the eastern shores of Lake Tanganyika).

References

Butterflies described in 1937
Erionotini